Ochoa Point is a 4,761-foot-elevation cliff-summit located in the eastern Grand Canyon, in Coconino County of northern Arizona, US. The landform is on a southeast ridgeline from Apollo Temple, with the Ochoa Point prominence on its southeast terminus. Ochoa Point is 1.0 mi from Apollo Temple, 1.5 mi northwest from the southeast-flowing Colorado River, and 3.5 miles due-west from the south terminus of the East Rim, Grand Canyon (Palisades of the Desert). Ochoa Point’s southwest cliff-flank, and Apollo Temple’s southwest arm (southeast flank), contain the dp-black Basalt Cliffs (composed of Cardenas Basalt); the Cardenas Basalt lies upon brilliantly colored reddish Dox Formation low-angle, erosion-slopes (units 5 and 4) of five Unkar Group members. What makes Ochoa Point distinctive, the next rock unit above is the colorful, layered (banded), Nankoweap Formation. These rock layers all slope at approximately 15 degrees, and are topped by the short-cliff, horizontal Tapeats Sandstone (the Tonto Platform, and called the Great Unconformity).

References

External links 

 Aerial view, Ochoa Point, Mountainzone

Grand Canyon
Landforms of Coconino County, Arizona